The following events took place in 2001 in the Democratic Republic of the Congo.

Incumbents
President:
Laurent-Désiré Kabila (until 16 January)
Joseph Kabila (from 17 January)
Prime Minister: Vacant

Events

January
16 January – President Laurent-Desire Kabila is shot and killed by a bodyguard.
17 January – His son Joseph Kabila becomes interim President.

April
26 April – Six members of the International Red Cross were killed in the Ituri Province.

August
The government met with rebel group leaders for talks on ending the Second Congo War.

September
Kofi Annan, Secretary-General of the United Nations, visited the DRC.

References

 
2000s in the Democratic Republic of the Congo
Years of the 21st century in the Democratic Republic of the Congo
Democratic Republic of the Congo
Democratic Republic of the Congo